The Oklahoma Intercollegiate Conference was an NAIA intercollegiate athletic conference that existed from 1974 to 1997 and the second of two conferences to share this name. The conference's members were located in the state of Oklahoma. Most of the team's members moved from the defunct Oklahoma Collegiate Conference in 1974, which itself evolved from the first iteration of the Oklahoma Intercollegiate Conference in 1929. The conference disbanded in 1997 after most of its members joined the NCAA Division II's  Lone Star Conference.

Member schools

Final members

Notes

Former members

Notes

Membership timeline

Football champions

1974 – Southwestern Oklahoma State
1975 – East Central
1976 – Southeastern Oklahoma State
1977 – Southwestern Oklahoma State
1978 – East Central
1979 – East Central
1980 – East Central, Northeastern State, and Southwestern Oklahoma State
1981 – Northeastern State
1982 – Northeastern State
1983 – Northeastern State
1984 – East Central
1985 – East Central and Southwestern Oklahoma State

1986 – East Central and Northwestern Oklahoma State
1987 – East Central and Northeastern State
1988 – Southeastern Oklahoma State
1989 – Northwestern Oklahoma State and Southeastern Oklahoma State
1990 – Northeastern State
1991 – Northeastern State
1992 – East Central and Southwestern Oklahoma State
1993 – Langston (OK)
1994 – Langston (OK), Northeastern State, and Southeastern Oklahoma State
1995 – Northeastern State
1996 – Southeastern Oklahoma State and Southwestern Oklahoma State

See also
 List of defunct college football conferences

References

 
College sports in Oklahoma